This list covers all satellites developed totally or partially in Brazil. Brazil does not currently have orbital launch capability and has historically had to rely on other countries.

List

Scientific and remote sensing
Key

Telecommunication
Brazilian satellites, but produced abroad:

See also
National Institute for Space Research
Brazilian Space Agency

References

Bibliography

satellites
Brazilian
Satellites of Brazil